The National Film School of Denmark is an independent institution under the Danish Ministry of Cultural Affairs. It was established in 1966 and is based on Holmen in the harbour of Copenhagen.

History 
In 1988 the school became an independent institution and in 1998 the school—until then spread out on several addresses—relocated to its current premises on Holmen as part of the Danish Centre for Artistic Educations.

Courses 
There are seven study programmes available: fiction directing, documentary directing, cinematography, script writing, editing, sound, animation and games directing, and film producing. The number of students is 96: 60 film students, 6 scriptwriters, 18 TV students and 12 animation directors. All courses are 4-year programmes, except the animation and games directing course which lasts 4½ years.

The school is an art school but practical knowledge is also very important. The teaching programme is a mixture of theoretical and practical training and includes a large number of exercises and productions. The students' final project is a film produced on a professional level and presented to the public on national TV. All students must pass an entrance test including both practical exercises and interviews.

Director Poul Nesgaard headed the school between 1992 and 2014, when film editor  took over. The number of employees amounts to about 50 persons, including teachers, technical and administrative staff. A large number of guest teachers are temporarily employed. The school also arranges courses for film and TV professionals from abroad and seminars with the participation of other Nordic countries.

Rectors

Alumni 

 Åke Sandgren (1982)
 Amanda Kernell
 Anders August (2007)
 Anders Morgenthaler (2002)
 Anders Refn (1969)
 Anthony Dod Mantle (1989)
 Bille August (1973, graduated as cinematographer)
  (1989)
 Christian Holten Bonke (2005)
 Christoffer Boe (2001)
 Dagur Kári (1999)
 Daniel Espinosa (2003)
 Eva Mulvad (2001)
 Jonas Elmer (1995)
 Katrin Ottarsdóttir
 Kim Fupz Aakeson (1996)
 Krass Clement (1978)
 Lars Von Trier (1982)
 Lisa Aschan
 Lone Scherfig (1984)
 Manuel Alberto Claro (2001)
 May el-Toukhy (2009)
 Niels Arden Oplev (1989)
 Ole Christian Madsen (1993)
 Per Fly (1993)
 Pernille Fischer Christensen (1999)
 Peter Flinth (1993)
  (2003)
 Reza Parsa (1995)
 Rumle Hammerich (1979)
 Sami Saif (1997)
 Susanne Bier (1987)
 Thomas Vinterberg (1993)
 Tobias Lindholm (2007)
 Vladimir Oravsky (1982)

See also 
 Danish Academy of Digital, Interactive Entertainment
 European Cross Media Academy

References

External links 
 

Higher education in Copenhagen
Denmark
Educational institutions established in 1966
1966 establishments in Denmark